Clément Parisse (born 6 July 1993) is a French cross-country skier. He has competed in the World Cup since the 2014 season.

He represented France at the FIS Nordic World Ski Championships 2015 in Falun, Sweden.

Cross-country skiing results
All results are sourced from the International Ski Federation (FIS).

Olympic Games
 2 medals – (2 bronze)

Distance reduced to 30 km due to weather conditions.

World Championships
 2 medals – (2 bronze)

World Cup

Season standings

Team podiums
 1 podium – (1 )

References

External links

1993 births
Living people
French male cross-country skiers
Cross-country skiers at the 2018 Winter Olympics
Cross-country skiers at the 2022 Winter Olympics
Tour de Ski skiers
Olympic cross-country skiers of France
Sportspeople from Essonne
Medalists at the 2018 Winter Olympics
Medalists at the 2022 Winter Olympics
Olympic bronze medalists for France
Olympic medalists in cross-country skiing
FIS Nordic World Ski Championships medalists in cross-country skiing
21st-century French people